Jefferson County Jail, also known as Jefferson County Jail and Sheriffs House, is a historic jail and residence located at Madison, Jefferson County, Indiana. It was built between 1848 and 1850, and is a two-story, rectangular Greek Revival style masonry building. The building consists of two blocks: a residential section in front and jail block at the rear. A kitchen wing was added in 1859. It features a classic pedimented gable temple front with a recessed entrance and pilasters.

It was listed on the National Register of Historic Places in 1973. It is located in the Madison Historic District.

References

External links

Historic American Buildings Survey in Indiana
Jails on the National Register of Historic Places in Indiana
Greek Revival architecture in Indiana
Government buildings completed in 1850
Buildings and structures in Jefferson County, Indiana
National Register of Historic Places in Jefferson County, Indiana
Historic district contributing properties in Indiana
Jails in Indiana